Abubakar Atiku Bagudu CON (born 26 December 1961) is a Nigerian politician and the current governor of Kebbi State, Nigeria. Previously, he served as the Senator for the Kebbi Central constituency of Kebbi state. He is a named accomplice in multiple investigations involving corruption that occurred during the regime of former Nigeria's military ruler Sani Abacha.

Early life and education
Although Bagudu came from a wealthy family, his father was the director of Primary Education in Kebbi.
He obtained a BSc (Economics), Usmanu Danfodiyo University Sokoto, Msc (Economics) University of Jos and M.A. (International Affairs). He is married to Zainab Bagudu, the First Lady of Kebbi State

Political career
Bagudu succeeded Adamu Aliero when he won the by-election for the Kebbi Central Senatorial seat following Aliero's appointment to become the Minister for FCT.
In the 6 April 2011 elections, Bagudu won for the PDP with 173,595 votes. His predecessor Adamu Aliero, who had moved to the Congress for Progressive Change (CPC), came second with 137,299 votes and Aliyu Bello Mohammed of the Action Congress of Nigeria (ACN) trailed with 11,953 votes.

During the 2015 General Elections, Atiku Bagudu then moved from the ruling PDP to the All Progressive Congress (APC) and contested for the Governorship, winning a landslide victory in the polls.

In the 9 March 2019 Kebbi State gubernatorial election Bagudu polled 673,717 votes, while his rival Sen. Isah Galaudu of PDP polled 106,633 votes.

Atiku Bagudu of Kebbi Abubakar Sadiq YelwaState contested and won the ticket for the All Progressives Congress (APC) for the upcoming Kebbi Central Senatorial ticket holding in 2023.

Corruption 
Bagudu was a known associate of former Nigerian dictator Sani Abacha, who was accused of stealing more than $2.2 billion of public funds during his five-year tenure as Nigerian president in the 1990s. In 2003, Bagudu was arrested and extradited from Houston, Texas at the request of Jersey, where Bagudu had set up a shell company called Doraville Properties to launder funds stolen from Nigeria. Bagudu eventually reached a settlement, agreeing to return $160 million of stolen money in exchange for deportation to Nigeria to face trial. Despite the considerable evidence from legal authorities in the U.S., Jersey, and Switzerland, Bagudu was never questioned after returning to Nigeria. In 2014, the U.S. Department of Justice announced the repatriation of $480 million stolen by Sani Abacha and his co-conspirators. In its complaint, the U.S. government alleged that Sani Abacha, his son Mohammed Sani Abacha, their associate Abubakar Atiku Bagudu and others "embezzled, misappropriated and extorted billions of dollars from the government of Nigeria and others, then laundered their criminal proceeds through U.S. financial institutions and the purchase of bonds backed by the United States." In February 2020, the U.S. government entered into a trilateral agreement with Nigeria and Jersey to repatriate over $300 million in additional money that Bagudu played a role in stealing during the Abacha regime. The U.S. announced that it was continuing to seek forfeiture of over $177 million in additional laundered funds held in trusts that name Bagudu and his relatives as beneficiaries.  Bagudu is immune from prosecution while governor.

Bagudu was one of the Nigerians unveiled by the 2021 Pandora Papers as hiding dirty money in offshore shell companies.

See also
List of Governors of Kebbi State

Award 
In October 2022, a Nigerian national honour of Commander Of The Order Of The Niger (CON) was conferred on him by President Muhammadu Buhari.

References

1961 births
Living people
All Progressives Congress politicians
Peoples Democratic Party members of the Senate (Nigeria)
21st-century Nigerian politicians
People from Kebbi State
Governors of Kebbi State